The 2021 La Flèche Wallonne is a road cycling one-day race that took place on 21 April 2021 from the Belgian city of Charleroi to the municipality of Huy. It was the 85th edition of La Flèche Wallonne and the 15th event of the 2021 UCI World Tour. It was won for the third time by Julian Alaphilippe.

Teams
Twenty-five teams were invited to the race, including all nineteen UCI WorldTeams and six UCI ProTeams. However,  had to withdraw from the race at the last moment because of two COVID-19 positives in the team.

UCI WorldTeams

 
 
 
 
 
 
 
 
 
 
 
 
 
 
 
 
 
 
 

UCI ProTeams

Result

References

External links 

2021
La Flèche Wallonne
La Flèche Wallonne
La Flèche Wallonne